George Warner (born 24 November 1989 in Bedford, England) is a rugby union player who formerly played for Leeds Carnegie in the Guinness Premiership.  From the 2010/11 season, he plays for Moseley in the RFU Championship.

References

External links

1989 births
Living people
English rugby union players
Leeds Tykes players
Moseley Rugby Football Club players
Rugby union players from Bedford
Rugby union hookers